The Iya is a river in Irkutsk Oblast in Russia. The Iya flows into the Okinsky Bay of the Bratsk Reservoir. The river freezes up in late October or early November and stays icebound until late April or early May. The town Tulun lies on the Iya.

References

Rivers of Irkutsk Oblast